The Kentucky Geological Survey (KGS) is a department of the University of Kentucky that provides information on the geology of Kentucky.

According to its website, the KGS "conducts research, collects data, and serves as the State's official archive for data on petroleum, coal, minerals, ground water, and topographic and geologic maps."

External links
Kentucky Geological Survey website

University of Kentucky
Geological surveys